Fromis 9 (stylized as fromis_9) is a South Korean girl group formed by CJ E&M through the 2017 reality show Idol School. The group is composed of eight members: Roh Ji-sun, Song Ha-young, Lee Sae-rom, Lee Chae-young, Lee Na-gyung, Park Ji-won, Lee Seo-yeon and Baek Ji-heon. Originally a nine-piece group, Jang Gyu-ri departed the group on July 31, 2022.

The group debuted on January 24, 2018, under Stone Music Entertainment with the release of their first extended play (EP), To. Heart. In September 2018, it was confirmed that Fromis 9 would be managed by Off the Record Entertainment, a new label established by Stone Music. As part of their transfer, Pledis Entertainment was in charge of creative direction and the production of the group's music.

The group was co-managed by Off the Record and Stone Music. As of August 16, 2021, as part of the label reorganization of Off the Record Entertainment, Pledis Entertainment will serve as the management company for the group.

Name
The group's name "Fromis_" was suggested by netizens through the official Idol School website and chosen by CJ E&M, with described as "From Idol School" and "Promise" in Korean pronunciation, also means "to keep their promise [to viewers] to be the best girl group". Through the announcement of their SNS accounts by their agency, the group decided to add 9 in their name to be "fromis_9".

History

Pre-debut: Formation through Idol School and "Glass Shoes"
In March 2017, it was announced that Mnet, the same channel responsible for several notable survival shows including Sixteen and Produce 101, would be launching a new reality survival show titled Idol School to form a new girl group. The show premiered on July 13 and ended on September 29, 2017, with Roh Ji-sun, Song Ha-young, Lee Sae-rom, Lee Chae-young, Lee Na-gyung, Park Ji-won, Lee Seo-yeon, Baek Ji-heon and Jang Gyu-ri as the nine members of Fromis. The final line-up was solely decided through live and online votes of viewers. Pledis Entertainment, led by CEO Han Sung-soo, managed the group's training and debut.

Fromis premiered its own reality program on October 19 titled Fromis' Room about continuing the path to debut. It followed the format of a simulcast, where it combined pre-recorded materials and replays of Facebook Live broadcasts in their dorm. The group's name was later changed to Fromis 9 following the final episode of Fromis' Room on November 23, with the "9" meaning the nine students who graduated from Idol School.

On November 29, Fromis 9 performed their pre-debut single titled "Glass Shoes" at the 2017 Mnet Asian Music Awards in Japan. The song was released as a digital single the following day. They also performed the song on the December 15 episode of Music Bank, marking the group's first-ever appearance in a music program.

2018: Debut with To. Heart, To. Day, and From.9
On January 8, 2018, it was announced that Fromis 9 would officially debut with their first extended play (EP) titled To. Heart. The EP, along with its lead single, "To Heart", was released on January 24. The EP debuted at number 4 on the Gaon Album Chart issued on January 27, 2018.

On May 10, it was confirmed that Jang Gyu-ri had entered as a contestant in Produce 48. Fromis 9 continued as an eight-member group and released their second EP, To. Day, on June 5, without Jang due to her participation in the show. Fromis 9 went back to being a nine-member group after Jang Gyu-ri was eliminated in the 3rd elimination as she ranked at 25th place.

Starting from September 21, Fromis 9 would be managed under Off The Record Entertainment, a new agency exclusively established for Fromis 9 and South Korean-Japanese girl group, Iz*One.

The group released a special single album titled From.9 on October 10 with the title song, “Love Bomb”.  It was the first comeback with all the 9 members after the return of Jang Gyu-ri.

On October 15, Fromis 9 made their acting debut in a web series, Welcome to Heal Inn, on their official VLive page. However, it was filmed during Jang Gyu-ri's absence.

2019–2020: Fun Factory and My Little Society
On February 8, 2019, a second short/mini season of Welcome to Heal Inn was announced for the Winter Season, this time with Jang Gyu-ri added as a new traveller. In May, Jang made her solo acting debut in the web drama, Compulsory Dating Education.

On June 4, 2019, Fromis 9 released their first single album Fun Factory, featuring the title track "Fun!". The album reached number 2 on the Gaon Album Chart, a new high for the group.

The group released their third EP My Little Society on September 16, 2020. This features the title track "Feel Good (Secret Code)". On September 10, Off The Record confirmed that Lee Seo-yeon would sit out of all promotions for this comeback due to a recent leg injury, and the group will promote as eight members. The EP reached no. 3 on the Gaon Album Chart.

2021: 9 Way Ticket, new management, and Talk & Talk
On May 17, the group released their second single album 9 Way Ticket, featuring the title track "We Go".

On August 16, it was announced that Fromis 9 has departed from Off The Record and that Pledis Entertainment will take over the group's management.

On September 1, the group released their new special single album Talk & Talk, featuring the title track of the same name. On September 7, the group achieved their first ever music show win on SBS MTV's The Show with "Talk & Talk".

2022–present: Midnight Guest, From Our Memento Box and Jang Gyu-ri's departure from the group
On January 17, 2022, Fromis 9 released their fourth EP Midnight Guest, featuring the title track "DM".

On February 24, 2022, it was announced that member Baek Ji-heon would be taking a break from activities due to health concerns.

On June 27, 2022, Fromis 9 released their fifth EP From Our Memento Box, featuring the title track "Stay This Way".

On July 28, 2022, Pledis Entertainment announced that member Jang Gyu-ri would be leaving the group on July 31. In their press release, Pledis stated that when Fromis 9's management were transferred to the company in 2021, every other member signed a completely new contract with the company. However, Jang chose to transfer her original contract from CJ ENM's Off The Record that would last only one year. After July 31, Fromis 9 will continue as an eight-member group.

On October 28, 2022, it was announced that members Lee Sae-rom and Lee Seo-yeon would be taking a break from activities due to health concerns.

Members

Current 
 Lee Sae-rom – leader
 Song Ha-young
 Park Ji-won
 Roh Ji-sun
 Lee Seo-yeon
 Lee Chae-young
 Lee Na-gyung
 Baek Ji-heon

Former 
 Jang Gyu-ri

Discography

Extended plays

Single albums

Singles

Soundtrack appearances

Music videos

Awards and nominations

Notes

References

External links

 

K-pop music groups
2018 establishments in South Korea
Musical groups established in 2018
Musical groups from Seoul
South Korean girl groups
South Korean dance music groups
South Korean pop music groups
Pledis Entertainment artists
Hybe Corporation artists